Galileotoppen is a mountain on Spitsbergen in Svalbard, Norway. It is located west of Wijdefjorden northwest of Newtontoppen in the south of Ny-Friesland. It is named for the Italian astronomer Galileo Galilei (1564–1642).

References

Mountains of Spitsbergen